Raúl Eugenio Figueroa Salas (born 21 March 1975) is a Chilean politician and lawyer.

Political career 
He worked in the Ministry of Education during the entire first government of Sebastián Piñera (2010-2014), first as head of the Legal Division and then as head of advisers to the ministry. During Sebastián Piñera's campaign (2017), he was coordinator of the educational program.

In March 2018, he became Undersecretary of Education. On February 28, 2020, he was appointed as Minister of Education of the second government of Sebastián Piñera.

References

External links

1975 births
Living people
Chilean people
Pontifical Catholic University of Chile alumni
University of the Andes, Chile alumni
21st-century Chilean politicians
Chilean Ministers of Education